Antwuan is a given name. Notable people with this name include the following people.

Antwuan Dixon (born 1988), American skateboarder
Antwuan Wyatt (born 1975), American gridiron football player

See also

Antjuan Tobias
Antuan
Antwaan Randle El
Antwan
Antwaun
Antwun Echols